Seifertite is a silicate mineral with the formula SiO2 and is one of the densest polymorphs of silica. It has only been found in Martian and lunar meteorites, where it is presumably formed from either tridymite or cristobalite – other polymorphs of quartz – as a result of heating during the atmospheric re-entry and impact to the Earth, at an estimated minimal pressure of 35 GPa. It can also be produced in the laboratory by compressing cristobalite in a diamond anvil cell to pressures above 40 GPa. The mineral is named after Friedrich Seifert (born 1941), the founder of the Bayerisches Geoinstitut at University of Bayreuth, Germany, and is officially recognized by the International Mineralogical Association.

Seifertite forms micrometre-sized crystalline lamellae embedded into a glassy SiO2 matrix. The lamellae are rather difficult to analyze, as they vitrify within seconds under laser or electron beams used for standard Raman spectroscopy or electron-beam microanalysis, even at much reduced beam intensities. Nevertheless, it was possible to verify that it is mainly composed of SiO2 with minor inclusions of Na2O (0.40 wt.%) and Al2O3 (1.14 wt.%). X-ray diffraction reveals that the mineral has scrutinyite (α-PbO2) type structure with an orthorhombic symmetry and Pbcn or Pb2n space group. Its lattice constants a = 4.097, b = 5.0462, c = 4.4946, Z = 4 correspond to the density of 4.294 g/cm3, which is among the highest for any forms of silica (for example, the density of quartz is 2.65 g/cm3). Only stishovite has a comparable density of about 4.287 g/cm3.

See also
 Coesite
 Stishovite

References 

Silicate minerals
Orthorhombic minerals
Minerals in space group 60
Silica polymorphs